Nachna village and a  Panchayat committee located in Pokhran tehsil of Jaisalmer district in Rajasthan, India. It is situated 85km away from sub-district headquarter Pokaran and 120km away from district headquarter Jaisalmer. it's famous for, the march of the desert.

The total geographical area of the village is 38719 hectares. Nachna has a total population of 8,335 people. There are about 1,093 houses in Nachna village. Pokaran is nearest town to Nachna which is approximately 85km away.

References 

Villages in Jaisalmer district